The Mayor of Verbania is an elected politician who, along with the Verbania's City Council, is accountable for the strategic government of Verbania in Piedmont, Italy. The current Mayor is Silvia Marchionini, a member of the Democratic Party, who took office on 9 June 2014.

Overview
According to the Italian Constitution, the Mayor of Verbania is member of the City Council.

The Mayor is elected by the population of Verbania, who also elects the members of the City Council, controlling the Mayor's policy guidelines and is able to enforce his resignation by a motion of no confidence. The Mayor is entitled to appoint and release the members of his government.

Since 1995 the Mayor is elected directly by Verbania's electorate: in all mayoral elections in Italy in cities with a population higher than 15,000 the voters express a direct choice for the mayor or an indirect choice voting for the party of the candidate's coalition. If no candidate receives at least 50% of votes, the top two candidates go to a second round after two weeks. The election of the City Council is based on a direct choice for the candidate with a preference vote: the candidate with the majority of the preferences is elected. The number of the seats for each party is determined proportionally.

Kingdom of Italy (1861–1946)
The city of Verbania was founded by the fascist government in 1939 and was ruled by an authoritarian Podestà chosen by the National Fascist Party. The office of Mayor of Verbania was created in 1945 during the Allied occupation.

Italian Republic (since 1946)

City Council election (1946-1995)
From 1946 to 1995, the Mayor of Verbania was elected by the City's Council.

Direct election (since 1995)
Since 1995, under provisions of new local administration law, the Mayor of Verbania is chosen by direct election.

Timeline

References

Verbania
 
Politics of Piedmont
Verbania